One More Time is the second studio album by Real McCoy under Arista Records and the third under BMG Berlin. It was the follow-up to the multi-platinum selling album Another Night. Music producer Juergen Wind (J. Wind) wrote and produced the album with the Sweden based production team known as Lemon Productions (Per Adebratt, Douglas Carr & Tony Ekman). American songwriter Brent Argovitz and German rapper Olaf Jeglitza worked together as songwriters on the album. A producer duo known as the Berman Brothers also produced a Shania Twain cover for the album and made the remixes for the singles. For promotional reasons, Jeglitza was credited as an Executive Producer alongside Wind and Arista Records CEO Clive Davis. Released worldwide in early 1997, the album failed to match the success of its predecessor, peaking at No. 55 on the Canadian Hot 100 and No. 79 on the US Billboard 200. The lead single from the album, (also called "One More Time"), reached No.3 in Australia and achieved Platinum status in the country but saw lesser success in the US, peaking at No. 27 on the charts. The follow-up singles "I Wanna Come (With You)" and the Shania Twain cover "(If You're Not in It for Love) I'm Outta Here!" failed to chart and were also commercial failures.

Critical reception
William Cooper from AllMusic gave the album a negative review, saying; "only the title track, a catchy, lightweight piece of pop fluff, makes any kind of impression. Most of One More Time is empty filler, and a couple of moments are unbearable: the silly "I Wanna Come (With You)" teases with the provocative title but fails to deliver, and the absurd Euro-pop remake of Shania Twain's "If You're Not in It for Love (I'm Outta Here)" is awful, but it isn't even bad enough to be fun. European dance acts rarely have a long shelf life, and this album proves The Real McCoy is no exception. Stick with the debut."

Track listing

Standard edition

US edition
 "One More Time" – 3:59
 "I Wanna Come (With You)" – 3:25
 "Give a Little Love" – 3:31
 "(If You're Not in It for Love) I'm Outta Here" – 3:58
 "Love Almost Faded" – 3:23
 "Look at Me" – 4:24
 "Love Save Me" – 4:08
 "Take a Look at Your Life" – 4:08
 "The Sky Is the Limit" – 3:38
 "Love Is a Stranger" – 3:38
 "Tomorrow" – 4:05
 "Tonight" – 3:49
 CD-ROM multimedia presentation

Japanese edition
 "One More Time" (UK radio mix) – 5:08
 "One More Time" (original radio mix) – 3:49
 "Give a Little Love" – 3:33
 "The Sky Is the Limit" – 3:39
 "Tomorrow" – 4:07
 "I Wanna Come (With You)" – 4:02
 "Love Almost Faded" – 3:25
 "Party" – 3:58
 "Take a Look at Your Life" – 4:09
 "Love Save Me" – 4:09
 "Love Is a Stranger" – 3:40
 Silly" – 4:20
 "Look at Me" – 4:27
 "Tonight" – 3:50
 "(If You're Not in It for Love) I'm Outta Here!" – 3:56
 "Start Loving Me" – 3:27
 "One More Time" (Mox Lazy Dub) – 6:37

Personnel

Members
 Olaf Jeglitza (O-Jay)
 Vanessa Mason
 Lisa Cork

Producers
 Juergen Wind (J. Wind) – executive producer
 Berman Brothers
 Per Adebratt, Douglas Carr & Tony Ekman for Lemon Productions

Charts

References

1997 albums
Arista Records albums
Real McCoy (band) albums